Mike Dooley (born 7 February 1961, Orange, California) is a New York Times bestselling author, speaker, and entrepreneur in the philosophical New Thought movement. His teachings contain the premise that our "thoughts become things," an expression he made popular in Rhonda Byrne's book and video documentary on the Law of Attraction, The Secret.

Education 
Dooley graduated from the University of Florida in 1983 with a Bachelor of Science in Accounting.

Career 
Dooley worked in Florida, Saudi Arabia, and Massachusetts as an international tax specialist for 
Price Waterhouse Coopers before co-founding TUT Enterprises, Inc. in 1989 with his brother, Andy Dooley and mother.

TUT sold its own line of T-shirts and gifts from a small chain of stores and through a distributor in Jyoetsu, Japan. In 1999 the company wound down retail and wholesale operations and Dooley became the sole shareholder, transforming the business into today's TUT’s Adventurer's Club, a philosophical club for understanding and living the adventure of life. By October 2021, there were 1 million members, all of whom receive Dooley's daily e-mailings, "Notes from the Universe", which have spun off into books, calendars, greeting cards, and world tours.

Dooley's work has been published in 27 languages.

Books and other publications

External links

References 

1961 births
Living people
People from Orange, California
21st-century American businesspeople
American male writers